Michael Suen Ming-yeung  GBS CBE; born 7 April 1944) who served as Acting Chief Secretary for Administration in 2005 and 2012 and as Secretary for Education of Hong Kong from 2007 to 2012.

Born in Chongqing in 1944, his family fled the then provisional capital of Republic of China to Hong Kong in 1947.

Education
Suen attended Wah Yan College, a Jesuit school in Hong Kong.

Career
He joined the colonial Hong Kong Government in 1966 as an Administrative Officer and was promoted to the rank of Director of Bureau in January 1991.

During the early years of his career, he served in the former New Territories Administration, Resettlement Department and Environment Branch. He was appointed Secretary for Constitutional Affairs in March 1989 and Secretary for Home Affairs in November 1991. He continued his post as Secretary for Home Affairs on 8 July 1997 and took up the appointment as Secretary for Constitutional Affairs on 4 August 1997. Suen took up the post of Secretary for Housing, Planning and Lands on 1 July 2002.

Upon the resignation of Donald Tsang on 25 May 2005, he assumed the post as the acting Chief Secretary for Administration, until Rafael Hui was appointed. In July 2007, he took over the position of Secretary for Education after Arthur Li retired.

Around 2007 he was known for pushing trilingual education with English, Cantonese and Putonghua to boost Hong Kong's competitiveness.

Health
On 27 April 2011, Suen announced that he was suffering from renal failure. Suen was also diagnosed with Legionnaires' disease on 21 December 2011. The new HK government headquarters found as many as 19 areas contaminated with legionella bacteria out of 43 water samples. Suen announced his recovery in January 2012.

Controversy

2007 protest at home
For years as a housing chief, Suen denied to meet with housing rights activists until 2007, when some 30 activists, including Longhair Leung Kwok-hung finally camped out at Suen's house in Happy Valley to protest. Public housing citizens were suffering from excessive rent increase, and the activists tried to voice the concern. The protest turned violent outside his home, with five policemen and one protester injured. Leung was also arrested.

Illegal extension case
In 1994 Suen purchased a new home, the low-rise Shuk Yuen building in Green Lane Happy Valley. He then illegally extended the size of his home to make it bigger. As the former Secretary for Housing, Planning and Lands, his staff reportedly warned him against the illegal extension, sending him a letter in April 2006 to remove the extension, which he reportedly ignored. In 2011, he agreed to reduce the size of the structure. Both the democratic and pro-Beijing camps criticised him.

See also
 List of graduates of University of Hong Kong

References

1947 births
Living people
Government officials of Hong Kong
Politicians from Chongqing
Commanders of the Order of the British Empire
Recipients of the Gold Bauhinia Star
HK LegCo Members 1988–1991